Gunniopsis tenuifolia, commonly known as the narrow-leaf pigface, is a succulent plant in the iceplant family, Aizoaceae. It is endemic to Australia.

It has a reddish tinge to the branchlets. It blooms between August and January producing small green-yellow flowers.

It is found on rocky lopes of low hills, clay flats and depressions that flood periodically flooding usually in open mallee woodland areas in central South Australia, between Leigh Creek and Arckaringa where it grows in clay soils.

Taxonomy and naming
The species was first formally described by Robert Chinnock in 1983 in the article The Australian genus Gunniopsis Pax (Aizoaceae) in the Journal of the Adelaide Botanic Gardens. The specific epithet (tenuifolia) is from Latin tenuifolius, meaning "slender-leaved".

References

tenuifolia
Flora of South Australia
Plants described in 1983